Diego Manzoni (born 4 August 1990) is an Italian former footballer who played as a goalkeeper.

Career

Early career
A youth product of Pergocrema, Manzoni was loaned to Serie A club Genoa C.F.C. in 2007–08 season. Manzoni was on the bench in 2008 Torneo di Viareggio, as the backup of Mirko Lamantia.

Parma
Manzoni was signed by Parma on 31 August 2009 in a direct player swap, for €500,000. Francesco Pambianchi and Niccolò Galli moved to Pergocrema in co-ownership deal for a total fee of €500,000 (However both player had joined the club in January and July 2009 in co-ownership for peppercorn already, and Parma bought back for peppercorn and resold for a total of €500,000). Manzoni signed a 5-year contract. He did not have a shirt number in the first team nor had a place in the youth team (which played by overage player Stefano Russo instead) In 2010-11 season, he remained at Parma's youth team as overage player, however he did not play any game.

Ghost player
On 29 June 2011, 2 days before the closure of 2010–11 financial year of "Parma F.C. S.p.A.", he joined Genoa in co-ownership deal, for €1.7 million in a 4-year contract, but in July returned to Parma on loan. However, he still did not have a first team squad number and new signing Alberto Gallinetta became the third keeper of the team. The co-ownership was renewed in June 2012, 2013 and 2014. In 2015 the contract and the co-ownership finally expired, making Genoa having a co-ownership income of €1.7 million, as well as a loss to Parma's account for the same amount. Parma bankrupted in March 2015 and fold in June.

References

External links
 

Italian footballers
U.S. Pergolettese 1932 players
Genoa C.F.C. players
Parma Calcio 1913 players
Association football goalkeepers
1990 births
Living people